Ceiling effect might refer to:

 Ceiling effect (pharmacology)
 Ceiling effect (statistics)

See also
 Ceiling (disambiguation)